August Englas (15 January 1925 – 21 March 2017) was an Estonian wrestler who competed for the Soviet Union.

Englas was born in Otepää. In the 1952 Summer Olympics, after defeating Adil Atan, Shirang Vithoba Jadav and Max Leichter, and losing against Henry Wittenberg and Viking Palm, he took fourth place. He won the gold medal at the 1953 and 1954 World Championships.

Awards
 Order of the Red Banner of Labour
 Order of the White Star Fourth Class (1999)
 Order of the Estonian Olympic Committee (2008)

References

External links
 

1925 births
2017 deaths
People from Otepää
Estonian male sport wrestlers
Soviet male sport wrestlers
Olympic wrestlers of the Soviet Union
Wrestlers at the 1952 Summer Olympics
World Wrestling Championships medalists
Recipients of the Order of the White Star, 4th Class
Burials at Metsakalmistu